Colonel Edward Bromfield Ferrers DSO was the 7th Commander of the Ceylon Defence Force. He was appointed on 29 April 1929 until 3 March 1935. He was succeeded by Robert Burton Lesley.

References

Commanders of the Ceylon Defence Force
Black Watch officers
Companions of the Distinguished Service Order